Hrant Ignati Matevosyan (12 February 1935 - 19 December 2002) was an Armenian writer and screenwriter. By the time of his death he was considered Armenia's "most prominent and accomplished contemporary novelist".

Biography
Hrant Matevosyan was born in 1935 in the village of Ahnidzor, now located in Armenia's Lori Province. He studied in the village school then continued his education at the Pedagogical University of Kirovakan (now Vanadzor). In 1952 he moved to Yerevan where he worked at a printing house. From 1958 until 1962, Matevosyan was a proofreader for the magazine Sovetakan Grakanutyun ("Soviet Literature") and the newspaper Grakan Tert ("Literary Newspaper").

Matevosyan started his literary career in 1961 with an essay "Ahnidzor". His first story collection Ogostos (August) was published in 1967. He headed the Writers' Union of Armenia from 1995 until 2000. His literary pieces have been translated into around 40 languages, including Russian, English, French, German, Lithuanian, Estonian, and Georgian.

Matevosyan died of cancer on 12 December 2002 at the age of 67. He is buried at Komitas Pantheon which is located in the city center of Yerevan. He had two children, a son and a daughter.

Education
 Kirovakan Pedagogical University
 1958-1962 — Yerevan State Pedagogical Institute, Department of History and Linguistics
 1966-1967 — Moscow Higher Course on Scriptwriting

Awards
 1967 — "Дружба народов" (Friendship of Nations) magazine award
 1984 — USSR State Literature Award
 1984 — USSR State Literature Award
 1996 — Knight of RA Mesrop Mashtots order

Works

Short stories
 1962 — We and Our Mountains (short story)
 1974 — Carriage Horses
 1982 - Tashkent
 1973 — Autumn Sun
 The Master
 Along the Edge (incomplete)
 Buffalo
 The Country's Nerve

Stories
 1967 — August
 1967 — Orange Pony
 1967 — Mesrop
 1968 — Buffalo
 1987 - Trees

Articles and essays
 Metsamor
 In Front of White Paper
 It's Me

Film scripts and plays
 1969 — We and Our Mountains (film)
 1969 — The Poor's Honour (film)
 1975 — This Green, Red World (film)
 1977 — Autumn Sun (film)
 1977 — August
 1979 — Aramayis Yerznkyan (film)
 1983 - Neutral Zone (play)
 1984 — The Master (film)
 1992 — National Army (film)

References

External links
 Hrant Matevosyan's official website
 Armenian Encyclopedia
 Armenian writer Hrant Matevosyan would celebrate 78th birthday today 
 No Week without Hrant Matevossian

1935 births
2002 deaths
21st-century Armenian male writers
20th-century Armenian writers
20th-century male writers
21st-century Armenian writers
21st-century Armenian screenwriters
Soviet screenwriters
Male screenwriters
Recipients of the USSR State Prize
High Courses for Scriptwriters and Film Directors alumni
Burials at the Komitas Pantheon
20th-century screenwriters